Abdelmadjid Mada (born 6 April 1953) is a retired Algerian long-distance runner who specialized in the 10,000 metres.

He competed in both the 10,000 metres and the marathon at the 1980 Olympic Games, but was knocked out in the heat of the 10,000 metres and failed to finish the marathon. He also won a gold medal at the 1979 Mediterranean Games, and a silver medal at the 1981 Maghreb Championships.

His personal best times were 28.33.08 minutes in the 10,000 metres, achieved in 1979; and 2.15.01 hours in the marathon, achieved in 1980.

Achievements

References

1953 births
Living people
Algerian male long-distance runners
Athletes (track and field) at the 1980 Summer Olympics
Olympic athletes of Algeria
Mediterranean Games gold medalists for Algeria
Mediterranean Games medalists in athletics
Athletes (track and field) at the 1979 Mediterranean Games
21st-century Algerian people